XHCJX-FM is a radio station on 99.9 FM in Bahía de Banderas, Nayarit, Mexico—primarily serving Puerto Vallarta, Jalisco—and carries the La Mejor Regional Mexican format from its owner, MVS Radio.

History
XHCJX received its concession on March 14, 1997. It was owned by Carmen Amalia Bernal Mendoza until being sold to MVS in 2000. Under MVS, the station initially carried its Stereorey adult contemporary format before switching to Exa FM in 2001 and then to La Mejor in 2015.

References

Radio stations in Nayarit
MVS Radio